The Roman Catholic Diocese of Cabinda is a diocese located in the city of Cabinda in the ecclesiastical province of Luanda in Angola.

History
 2 July 1984: Established as Diocese of Cabinda from the Metropolitan Archdiocese of Luanda. It comprises the province of Cabinda.

Special churches
The Cathedral of the diocese is the Cathedral church of Our Lady Queen of the World in Cabinda.

Leadership
 Bishops of Cabinda (Roman rite)
 Bishop Paulino Fernandes Madeca (2 July 1984  – 11 February 2005)
 Bishop Filomeno do Nascimento Vieira Dias (11 February 2005  – 8 December 2014; apostolic administrator through 7 October 2018), appointed Archbishop of Luanda
 Bishop Belmiro Cuica Chissengueti, C.S.Sp. (3 July 2018–present )

See also
Roman Catholicism in Angola

Sources
 GCatholic.org

Roman Catholic dioceses in Angola
Christian organizations established in 1984
Roman Catholic dioceses and prelatures established in the 20th century
Cabinda, Roman Catholic Diocese of
1984 establishments in Angola